Cassiar may refer to:

Cassiar, British Columbia, a ghost town in northern British Columbia
Stewart-Cassiar Highway,  the northwesternmost highway in British Columbia
Cassiar Mountains, in northern British Columbia and southern Yukon
Cassiar Land District, a cadastral survey division of British Columbia
Cassiar River, a tributary of the Turnagain River
Cassiar Tunnel (sometimes called the Cassiar Connector), a highway traffic tunnel on the Trans-Canada Highway in Vancouver, British Columbia
Cassiar (electoral district), a former provincial electoral district in northern British Columbia
Cassiar Gold Rush (1873), a gold rush in British Columbia
Cassiar Country, a historical region in British Columbia

See also

 Cassia (disambiguation)
 Kaskian (disambiguation), a term that derives Cassiar
 Kaskas (disambiguation), a term that derives Cassiar
 Kaska (disambiguation), a term that derives Cassiar